Stathmodera is a genus of beetles in the family Cerambycidae, containing the following species:

 Stathmodera aethiopica Breuning, 1940
 Stathmodera conradti Breuning, 1960
 Stathmodera densesulcata Breuning, 1940
 Stathmodera flavescens Breuning, 1940
 Stathmodera grisea Breuning, 1939
 Stathmodera lineata Gahan, 1890
 Stathmodera minima Breuning, 1960
 Stathmodera pusilla Aurivillius, 1907
 Stathmodera subvittata Breuning, 1981
 Stathmodera truncata (Fairmaire, 1896)
 Stathmodera unicolor Breuning, 1960
 Stathmodera vittata Breuning, 1940
 Stathmodera wagneri Adlbauer, 2006

References

Apomecynini
Taxa named by Charles Joseph Gahan